Ongjin County is a county in southern South Hwanghae Province, North Korea.  It is located on the Ongjin Peninsula, which projects into the Yellow Sea.

History 
The Ongjin Peninsula lies below the 38th parallel, and was therefore in the Southern zone, which became the Republic of Korea.  However, the Ongjin Peninsula was isolated from other southern territories, and therefore difficult to defend.  Some of the earliest fighting in the Korean War came here as Northern forces took the Ongjin Peninsula.  The Armistice Line at the end of the Korean War left Ongjin County in North Korea.

Geography 
Ongjin County is on the Ongjin Peninsula, with the Yellow Sea to the south and west.  The Ongjin Peninsula is further divided into the Kangryŏng Peninsula, the Tongnam Peninsula, and the Ryongch'ŏn Peninsula.  Geologically, Ongjin County is composed of coastal Lias.  The Ongjin Plain, Kangryŏng Bay, Hwasan Bay, and Taedong Bay are all located here, as is the Ongjin Bay Important Bird Area.  The climate is very mild.

Ongjin County includes three large islands.  Yonghodo (용호도) sits in the entrance to Kangryŏng Bay, Ch'angrindo (창린도) is outside the entrance to Ongjin Bay, and Kirindo (기린도) lies south of the western end of the Ongjin Peninsula.

Administrative divisions
Ongjin county is divided into 1 ŭp (town), 3 rodongjagu (workers' districts) and 24 ri (villages)

Economy 
Rice is the major crop.  Wheat, corn, beans, sweet potatoes, and cotton are also grown.  The area was once heavily forested, but not much forest land remains.  The nearby meeting of warm and cold currents make this a centre of the fishing industry.  Gold, silica sand, and marble are also mined.  The Ongjin Hot Springs are a popular tourist destination.

Transportation
Ongjin county is served by the Ongjin Line of the Korean State Railway.

See also
Administrative divisions of North Korea
Geography of North Korea

References

External links

Military air bases in Ongjin County

Counties of South Hwanghae